Events from the year 1956 in the United States.

Incumbents

Federal Government 
 President: Dwight D. Eisenhower (R-Kansas/New York)
 Vice President: Richard Nixon (R-California)
 Chief Justice: Earl Warren (California)
 Speaker of the House of Representatives: Sam Rayburn (D-Texas)
 Senate Majority Leader: Lyndon B. Johnson (D-Texas)
 Congress: 84th

Events

January–March
 January 1 – Carl Perkins' record "Blue Suede Shoes" is released by Sun Records in Memphis, Tennessee.
 January 3 – Peter Pan, starring Mary Martin, is restaged live by Producers' Showcase on NBC television by popular demand.
 January 8 – Operation Auca: Five U.S. missionaries are killed by the Huaorani of Ecuador shortly after making contact with them.
 January 22 – Redondo Junction train wreck in Los Angeles kills thirty people.
 c. January – The first book in Ed McBain's long-running 87th Precinct police procedural series, Cop Hater, is published under Evan Hunter's new pseudonym.
 February 14 – Dwight D. Eisenhower's doctors say that he is healthy enough to seek another term at the White House.
 February 16 – Only a little more than four months after the release of the 70 mm version of Oklahoma!, the film version of Rodgers and Hammerstein's Carousel, starring Gordon MacRae and Shirley Jones, is released in CinemaScope 55. MacRae and Jones had previously starred in Oklahoma! Carousel, intended for showing in 55 mm, ends up being shown only in 35 mm.
 February 22 – Elvis Presley enters the U.S. music charts for the first time with "Heartbreak Hotel".
 February 23 – Norma Jean Mortenson legally changes her name to Marilyn Monroe.
 February 24 – Doris Day records her most famous song, "Que Sera, Sera (Whatever Will Be, Will Be)"; it is from Alfred Hitchcock's The Man Who Knew Too Much, in which Day co-stars with James Stewart.
 February 29 – Dwight D. Eisenhower announces he will seek re-election as President.
 March 11 – Laurence Olivier's film, Richard III, adapted from Shakespeare's play, premieres in the U.S. in theaters and on NBC Television, on the same day as an afternoon matinée. It is one of the first such experiments of its kind. Olivier is later nominated for an Oscar for his performance.
 March 12 
The Dow Jones Industrial Average closes above 500 for the first time rising 2.40 points, or 0.48%, to 500.24.
96 U.S. Congressmen sign the Southern Manifesto, a protest against the 1954 Supreme Court ruling (Brown v. Board of Education) desegregating public education.
 March 13 – Elvis Presley releases his first Gold Album titled "Elvis Presley".
 March 15 – The Broadway musical My Fair Lady opens in New York City.
 March 21 – The 28th Academy Awards ceremony, hosted by Jerry Lewis, is held at RKO Pantages Theatre in Hollywood, Los Angeles, with the television broadcast hosted by Claudette Colbert and Joseph L. Mankiewicz in New York. Delbert Mann's Marty wins four awards, including Best Motion Picture and Best Director for Mann. The film is also tied for the most nominations with eight, along with Henry King's Love Is a Many-Splendored Thing and Daniel Mann's The Rose Tattoo.

April–June

 April 2 – The first episodes of As the World Turns  and The Edge of Night are broadcast on CBS television.
 April 14 – Videotape is first demonstrated at the 1956 NARTB (now NAB) convention in Chicago by Ampex. It is the demonstration of the first practical and commercially successful videotape format known as 2" Quadruplex.
 April 19 – American actress Grace Kelly marries Rainier III, Prince of Monaco.
 April 21 – Former U.S. First Daughter Margaret Truman marries Clifton Daniel.
 April 27 – Heavyweight boxing champion Rocky Marciano retires without losing a professional boxing match.
 May 2 – The Methodist Church in the U.S. decides, at its General Conference, to grant women full ordained clergy status. It also calls for an end to racial segregation in the denomination.
 May 22 – The Peacock logo of NBC is introduced on television.
 June 4 – Montgomery bus boycott: Browder v. Gayle is decided by the United States District Court for the Middle District of Alabama, ruling state bus segregation laws unconstitutional; this will be confirmed on appeal.
 June 5 – Elvis Presley performs "Hound Dog" on The Milton Berle Show, scandalizing the audience with his suggestive hip movements.
 June 8 – General Electric/Telechron introduces model 7H241 "The Snooz Alarm", first snooze alarm clock.
 June 14 
President of the United States Dwight D. Eisenhower authorizes the phrase "under God" to be added to the Pledge of Allegiance.
The Flag of the United States Army is formally dedicated.
 June 21 – Playwright Arthur Miller appears before the House Un-American Activities Committee in Washington, D.C.
 June 26 & August 23 – Books published by discredited psychoanalyst Wilhelm Reich are burned under a court injunction.
 June 29 
Actress Marilyn Monroe marries playwright Arthur Miller in White Plains, New York.
President Dwight D. Eisenhower signs the Federal Aid Highway Act, creating the Interstate Highway System.
 June 30 – A TWA Lockheed Constellation and United Airlines Douglas DC-7 collide in mid-air over the Grand Canyon in Arizona, killing all 128 people aboard both aircraft in the deadliest civil aviation disaster to date; the accident leads to sweeping changes in the regulation of cross-country flight and air traffic control over the U.S.
 June – 19-year-old Hunter S. Thompson is arrested as an accessory to robbery.

July–September
 July 2 – Sylvania Electric Products explosion: A laboratory experiment involving scrap thorium at Sylvania Electric Products in Bayside, New York, results in an explosion.
 July 4 – A U.S. Lockheed U-2 reconnaissance aircraft makes its first flight over the Soviet Union.
 July 13
 Elvis Presley's recording of "Hound Dog" is released by RCA Records.
 John McCarthy (Dartmouth), Marvin Minsky (MIT), Claude Shannon (Bell Labs) and Nathaniel Rochester (IBM) assemble the first coordinated research meeting on the topic of artificial intelligence, at Dartmouth College in Hanover, New Hampshire.
 July 16 – With the closing of its "Big Tent" show in Pittsburgh, Ringling Bros. and Barnum & Bailey Circus announces all subsequent circuses will be "arena shows" due to changing economics.
 July 24 – At New York City's Copacabana Club, Dean Martin and Jerry Lewis perform their last comedy show together (their act started on July 25, 1946).
 July 29 – McKee refinery fire kills 19 in Texas.
 July 30 – A Joint Resolution of Congress is signed by President Dwight D. Eisenhower, authorizing "In God We Trust" as the U.S. national motto.
 August 6 – After going bankrupt in 1955, the American broadcaster DuMont Television Network has its final broadcast, a boxing match from St. Nicholas Arena.
 August 11 – Painter Jackson Pollock dies in a car crash in Springs, New York.
 September 9 – Elvis Presley appears on The Ed Sullivan Show for the first time.
 September 13  – The hard disk drive is invented by an IBM team led by Reynold B. Johnson.
 September 27 – The Bell X-2 becomes the first manned aircraft to reach Mach 3.

October–December

 October 5 – Cecil B. DeMille's epic film The Ten Commandments, starring Charlton Heston as Moses, is released in the U.S. It will be in the top ten of the worldwide list of highest-grossing films of all time, adjusted for inflation.
 October 8 – Baseball pitcher Don Larsen of the New York Yankees throws the only perfect game in World Series history in Game 5 of the 1956 World Series against the Brooklyn Dodgers. Yogi Berra catches the game. Dale Mitchell is the final out. The New York Yankees win the series. Larsen is named series MVP.
 October 10 – The prototype Lockheed L-1649 Starliner, the final Lockheed Constellation model, makes its first flight.
 October 17 – The Game of the Century: 13-year-old Bobby Fischer beats GM Donald Byrne in the NY Rosenwald chess tournament.
 October 29 – The Huntley-Brinkley Report debuts on NBC-TV.
 October 31 – A U.S. Navy team becomes the third group to reach the South Pole (arriving by air) and commences construction of the first permanent Amundsen–Scott South Pole Station.
 October – The Ladder becomes the first nationally distributed lesbian magazine in the U.S.
 November 1
 City Lights Bookstore in San Francisco publishes Howl and Other Poems by Allen Ginsberg, a key work of the Beat Generation.
 The film Oklahoma! (1955), previously released to select cities in Todd-AO, now receives a U.S. national release in CinemaScope, since not all theatres are yet equipped for Todd-AO. To accomplish this, the film has actually been shot twice, rather than printing one version in two different film processes, as is later done.
 November 3 – MGM's screen classic, The Wizard of Oz, is shown on television for the first time by CBS, as the final installment of their Ford Star Jubilee.
 November 6 – 1956 United States presidential election: Republican incumbent Dwight D. Eisenhower defeats Democratic challenger Adlai E. Stevenson in a rematch of their contest four years earlier.
 November 13 – Browder v. Gayle: The United States Supreme Court declares Alabama laws requiring segregated buses illegal, thus ending the Montgomery bus boycott.
 November 30 – African American boxer Floyd Patterson wins the world heavyweight championship that is vacant after the retirement of Rocky Marciano.
 December 2 – A pipe bomb planted by George Metesky explodes at the Paramount Theater in Brooklyn, New York, injuring 6 people.
 December 3 – The 1956 Bush Terminal explosion occurs in Brooklyn.
 December 4 – The Million Dollar Quartet (Elvis Presley, Jerry Lee Lewis, Carl Perkins and Johnny Cash) get together at Sun Studio for the only time.
 December 18 – To Tell the Truth debuts on CBS-TV.
 December 31 – Bob Barker makes his TV debut as host of the game show Truth or Consequences.

Ongoing
 Cold War (1947–1991)
 Second Red Scare (1947–1957)

Births

January

 January 1 
Mark R. Hughes, entrepreneur (d. 2000)
Mike Mitchell, basketball player (d. 2011)
 January 3 – Mel Gibson, actor and filmmaker
 January 7 – David Caruso, actor (NYPD Blue)
 January 9 – Kimberly Beck, actress
 January 10
 Shawn Colvin, singer
 George Merrill, singer-songwriter and keyboard player
 January 11
 Big Bank Hank, rapper (d. 2014)
 Robert Earl Keen, singer-songwriter and guitarist
 January 13 – Janet Hubert, African-American actress
 January 18
 Sharon Mitchell, American sexologist 
 Jim Mothersbaugh, American rock drummer
 January 19 – Carman, singer (d. 2021)
 January 20 – Bill Maher, actor, comedian and political analyst
 January 21
 Robby Benson, actor, voice actor, director, singer and educator
 Geena Davis, actress
 January 26 – Pat Musick, voice actress
 January 27
 Susanne Blakeslee, actress
 Mimi Rogers, actress
 January 29 – Irlene Mandrell, actress and singer

February

 February 3
 Nathan Lane, actor (The Birdcage)
 Lee Ranaldo, musician (Sonic Youth)
 February 6 – Terry Teachout, writer and director (d. 2022)
 February 7 – John Posey, actor
 February 11 – Catherine Hickland, actress
 February 13 – Paul Stojanovich, television producer (d. 2003)
 February 18 – Bruce Rauner, businessman, politician, philanthropist and the 42nd governor of Illinois
 February 19
 Kathleen Beller, actress
 Roderick MacKinnon, biologist, recipient of the Nobel Prize in Chemistry in 2003
 February 22 – Hugh Hewitt, lawyer, academic and radio host
 February 24
 Howard Bragman, crisis management expert (d. 2023)
 Judith Butler, philosopher
 Eddie Murray, baseball player
 Paula Zahn, television journalist (CBS News)
 February 29
 Aileen Wuornos, serial killer (d. 2002)
 Mike Compton, mandolin player

March

 March 1 – Tim Daly, actor
 March 5 – Teena Marie, singer (d. 2010)
 March 7 – Bryan Cranston, actor
 March 11 – Rob Paulsen, voice actor
 March 13
 Dana Delany, actress
 Jamie Dimon, CEO of JPMorgan Chase
 March 24 – Steve Ballmer, CEO of Microsoft
 March 28 – Susan Ershler, mountaineer

April
 April 1 – Jeffrey Beecroft, production designer and art director
 April 3 – Ray Combs, game show host and comedian (d. 1996)
 April 4 – David E. Kelley, writer and television producer
 April 5 – Diamond Dallas Page, professional wrestler
 April 7 – Christopher Darden, lawyer
 April 14 – Barbara Bonney, soprano
 April 16  – David M. Brown, astronaut (Space Shuttle Columbia disaster) (d. 2003)
 April 18
 John James, actor (Dynasty)
 Melody Thomas Scott, actress
 Eric Roberts, American actor
 April 21 – Phillip Longman, demographer
 April 23 - Greg Colson, American artist
 April 27 – Bryan Harvey, American musician (d. 2006)

May

 May 4 – David Guterson, writer
 May 5 – Lisa Eilbacher, American actress
 May 6 – Cindy Lovell, American educator and writer
 May 7 – S. Scott Bullock, American actor and voice actor
 May 10 – Paige O'Hara, American actress, voice actress, singer and painter
 May 12 – Greg Phillinganes, keyboardist
 May 15 – Dan Patrick, sports commentator
 May 17
 Sugar Ray Leonard, boxer
 Bob Saget, actor, comedian and television host (d. 2022)
 May 19 – Steven Ford, actor
 May 20 – Dean Butler, actor and producer
 May 23 – Buck Showalter, baseball player and manager
 May 26 – Lisa Niemi, actress and dancer, spouse of Patrick Swayze
 May 28 – Jerry Douglas, dobro player
 May 29 – La Toya Jackson, singer

June

 June 1 – Lisa Hartman Black, actress, singer
 June 3
Brad Nessler, sportscaster 
Danny Wilde, singer-songwriter and guitarist 
 June 4 – Keith David, actor
 June 5 – Kenny G, grammy-award-winning saxophonist
 June 9 – Patricia Cornwell, novelist
 June 11 
 Joe Montana, football player
 Jamaaladeen Tacuma, jazz bassist and bandleader
 June 14 – Fred Funk, golfer and coach
 June 15 – Robin Curtis, actress
 June 17 – Kelly Curtis, actor
 June 19 – Danny Chauncey, guitarist 
 June 21 – Thomas James O'Leary, American actor
 June 22 – Tim Russ, actor, film director, screenwriter and musician
 June 23 – Randy Jackson, musician and talent judge
 June 25 – Anthony Bourdain, chef, author and television personality (d. 2018)
 June 26 – Chris Isaak, musician
 June 30
 David Alan Grier, actor, comedian
 Ronald Winans, musician (d. 2005)

July

 July 1 – Alan Ruck, actor
 July 2 – Jerry Hall, model and actress
 July 9 – Tom Hanks, actor and director
 July 11 – Sela Ward, actress
 July 12
 Mel Harris, actress
 Sandi Patty, gospel singer
 Gregg L. Semenza, cellular biologist, recipient of the Nobel Prize in Physiology or Medicine in 2019
 July 13 – Michael Spinks, African-American boxer
 July 16 – Tony Kushner, playwright
 July 18 
 Sheila Aldridge, singer (The Aldridge Sisters)
 Razor Shines, baseball player, manager and coach
 July 24
 Charlie Crist, politician
 Pat Finn, game show host and producer
 July 25 – Frances Arnold, biochemist, recipient of the Nobel Prize in Chemistry in 2018
 July 30 – Delta Burke, actress
 July 31
 Michael Biehn, actor
 Deval Patrick, 71st Governor of Massachusetts

August

 August 1 – Steve Green, Christian musician
 August 2 – Jim Neidhart, professional wrestler
 August 4 – Gerry Cooney, boxer
 August 5 – Maureen McCormick, actress (The Brady Bunch)
 August 6 – Stepfanie Kramer, actress (Hunter)
 August 10
 Fred Ottman, professional wrestler
 Charlie Peacock, Christian producer, singer-songwriter
 August 14 – Jackée Harry, actress and television personality
 August 18
 Jon "Bermuda" Schwartz, drummer
 Kelly Willard, Christian singer
 August 19 – Adam Arkin, actor
 August 20 – Joan Allen, actress
 August 21 – Jon Tester, U.S. Senator from Montana
 August 22 – Paul Molitor, baseball player
 August 24 
 John Culberson, politician
 Kevin Dunn, actor
 August 26 – Mark Mangino, football coach
 August 29 – Mark Morris, choreographer

September

 September 1 – Bernie Wagenblast, editor and broadcaster
 September 6 – Bill Ritter, 41st Governor of Colorado
 September 7 – Michael Feinstein, singer and pianist 
 September 8 – Maurice Cheeks, basketball player and coach
 September 11 – Phillip D. Bissett, politician
 September 12 
 Chip Beck, golfer
 Sam Brownback, U.S. Senator from Kansas
 Ricky Rudd, race car driver
 September 15 – George Howard, jazz saxophone musician (d. 1998)
 September 16 – David Copperfield, illusionist
 September 17 – Brian Andreas, writer, sculptor, painter and publisher
 September 20
 Gary Cole, actor
 Debbi Morgan, actress
 September 21 – Jack Givens, basketball player
 September 24 – Gregory Peter Panos, futurist, writer, inventor, virtual reality expert, human simulation visionary
 September 25 – Jamie Hyneman, television co-host (MythBusters)
 September 26 – Linda Hamilton, actress (The Terminator)
 September 30 – Carol Jenkins Barnett, businesswoman and philanthropist (d. 2021)

October

 October 8 – Stephanie Zimbalist, actress (Remington Steele)
 October 13
 Chris Carter, director, producer, and screenwriter
 Don Paige, runner
 October 16 – Marin Alsop, orchestral conductor
 October 17 
 Mae Jemison, astronaut
 Stephen Palumbi, American academic and author
 Ken Morrow, American ice hockey player
 October 18
 Jim Talent, U.S. Senator from Missouri
 Craig Bartlett, Animator, writer, storyboard artist, director and voice actor
 October 21 – Carrie Fisher, actress (Star Wars) (d. 2016)
 October 22 – Frank DiPino, baseball player and coach
 October 23
 Darrell Pace, archer
 Dwight Yoakam, country singer, musician and actor
 October 24 
 Dale Maharidge, journalist and author 
 Jeff Merkley, U.S. Senator from Oregon
 David Stergakos, American-Greek basketball player
 October 26 – Rita Wilson, actress and producer
 October 28 – Dave Wyndorf, singer-songwriter and guitarist

November

 November 3 – Dru C. Gladney, anthropologist (d. 2022)
 November 7 – Judy Tenuta, American comedian and musician (d. 2022)
 November 8 – Steven Miller, record producer
 November 10 – Sinbad, stand-up comedian and actor
 November 13 
 Charlie Baker, American politician, 72nd Governor of Massachusetts
 Cynthia Carroll, businesswoman
 November 14 
 Paul Mitchell, politician and businessman (d. 2021)
 Steve Stockman, accountant and politician
 November 15
 Michael Hampton, guitarist and producer (Parliament-Funkadelic and Kiddo)
 Brian Wells, crime victim (d. 2003)
 November 16 – Terry Labonte, Race Car Driver
 November 17 – Kelly Ward, actor
 November 18 – Warren Moon, football player
 November 20 – Bo Derek, actress and model
 November 21 – Terri Welles, actress and adult model
 November 22 
 Donald Baechler, painter and sculptor (d. 2022)
 Richard Kind, actor
 November 26 – Dale Jarrett, race car driver
 November 27 – William Fichtner, actor
 November 29
 Bill Baker, ice hockey player
 Eric Laakso, football player
 Leo Laporte, author and television host

December

 December 1 – Julee Cruise, musician (d. 2022)
 December 6 – Randy Rhoads, guitarist (d. 1982)
 December 7 – Larry Bird, basketball player
 December 10 
 Rod Blagojevich, politician Governor of Illinois
 Jacquelyn Mitchard, journalist and author
 December 11 – Lani Brockman, playwright
 December 18 – Ron White, comedian
 December 26 – David Sedaris, essayist
 December 30
 Patricia Kalember, actress
 Sheryl Lee Ralph, actress

Deaths

 January 9 – Marion Leonard, stage & silent film actress (born 1881)
 January 10 – Zonia Baber, geographer and geologist (born 1862)
 January 12 – Norman Kerry, silent film actor (born 1894)
 January 29 – H. L. Mencken, writer (born 1880)
 February 2
 Bob Burns, comedian (born 1890)
 Charley Grapewin, vaudeville, stage & film actor (born 1869)
 February 3 – Robert Yerkes, psychologist and ethologist (born 1876)
 February 8 – Connie Mack, baseball executive and manager (born 1862)
 February 15 – J. H. Smith, politician and pioneer (born 1858)
 February 26 – Elsie Janis, singer and actress (born 1889)
 March 14 – David Browning, Olympic diver; in aviation accident (born 1931)
 March 17 – Fred Allen, comedian (born 1894)
 March 18 – Louis Bromfield, writer and conservationist (born 1896)
 March 21 – Edwin Thanhouser, actor, businessman and film producer (born 1865)
 March 22 – George Sarton, historian of science (born 1884 in Belgium)
 March 25 – Lou Moore, racing driver and team owner (born 1904)
 April 15 – Kathleen Howard, opera singer and film actress (born 1884 in Canada)
 April 21
 Samuel Gottesman, pulp-paper merchant (born 1885)
 Charles MacArthur, playwright and screenwriter (born 1895)
 April 26 – Edward Arnold, film actor (born 1890)
 April 30 – Alben W. Barkley, 35th Vice President of the United States from 1949 to 1953 (born 1877)
 May 11 – Walter Sydney Adams, astronomer (born 1876) 
 May 12 – Louis Calhern, actor (born 1895)
 May 15 – Arthur Talmage Abernethy, poet, journalist, theologian and minister (born 1872)
 May 24 – Guy Kibbee, actor (born 1882)
 May 26 – Al Simmons, baseball player (Philadelphia Athletics) (born 1902)
 June 1 – Jesse H. Jones, entrepreneur, 9th United States Secretary of Commerce (born 1874)
 June 2 – Richard S. Edwards, admiral (born 1885)
 June 4 – Katherine MacDonald, silent film actress (born 1891)
 June 6 – Hiram Bingham III, explorer, discoverer of Machu Picchu (born 1875)
 June 11 – Ralph Morgan, character actor (born 1883)
 June 25 – Ernest King, Fleet Admiral (born 1878)
 June 26 – Clifford Brown, jazz trumpeter (born 1930)
 July 4 – Udo Keppler, cartoonist (Puck) (born 1872)
 August 2 – Albert Woolson, last surviving Union veteran of the American Civil War (born 1850)
 August 11 – Jackson Pollock, painter (born 1912)
 August 13 – Lyonel Feininger, German American painter (born 1871)
 August 16
 Bela Lugosi, actor (born 1882 in Hungary)
 Lynde D. McCormick, admiral (born 1895)
 August 23 – Peaches Browning, divorcee and vaudeville actress (born 1910)
 August 24 – Mitchell Lewis, actor (born 1880)
 August 25 – Alfred Kinsey, sex researcher (born 1894)
 September 6 – Felix Borowski, composer and teacher (born 1872 in the United Kingdom)
 September 27
 Milburn G. Apt, test pilot (born 1924)
 Babe Zaharias, golfer (born 1911)
 October 1 – Albert Von Tilzer, songwriter (born 1878)
 October 2 – George Bancroft, film actor (born 1882)
 October 9 – Marie Doro, stage & silent film actress (born 1882)
 October 18 – Charles Strite, inventor (born 1878)
 October 19 – Isham Jones, bandleader (born 1894)
 October 27 – Charles S. Johnson, sociologist (born 1893)
 November 1 – Tommy Johnson, Delta blues falsetto singer & guitarist (born 1896)
 November 5 – Art Tatum, jazz pianist (born 1909)
 November 6 – Paul Kelly, actor (born 1899)
 November 10
 Harry F. Sinclair, entrepreneur (born 1876)
 Victor Young, composer (born 1900)
 November 26 – Tommy Dorsey, trombonist and bandleader (born 1905)
 November 27 – Hugo Ballin, artist, film production designer and director (born 1879)
 December 9 – Charles Joughin, baker on RMS Titanic (born 1878 in the United Kingdom)
 December 17 – Eddie Acuff, actor (born 1903)
 December 21 – Lewis Terman, psychologist (born 1877)
 December 30 – Ruth Draper, monologuist (born 1884)

See also
 1955-56 in American soccer
 List of American films of 1956
 Timeline of United States history (1950–1969)

References

External links
 

 
1950s in the United States
United States
United States
Years of the 20th century in the United States